Santa Teresita may refer to:

Santa Teresita, Buenos Aires, Atlantic coastal holiday resort in La Costa Partido, Argentina
Santa Teresita, a village in Cayo District, Belize
Santa Teresita, Batangas, Philippines
Santa Teresita, Cagayan, Philippines
Thérèse of Lisieux, a saint venerated in the Roman Catholic Church

See also
 Teresita (disambiguation)